Mahmudabad (also Romanized as Maḩmūdābād) is a village in Kuh Sardeh Rural District, in the Central District of Malayer County, Hamadan Province, Iran. At the 2006 census, its population was 341, in 80 families.

References 

Populated places in Malayer County